The finals and the qualifying heats of the men's 50 metre freestyle event at the 1986 World Aquatics Championships were held on 22 August 1986 in Madrid, Spain.

Results

Heats

B Final

A Final

See also
Swimming at the 1988 Summer Olympics – Men's 50 metre freestyle

References

Freestyle Men 50